Proprioseiopsis cabonus is a species of mite in the family Phytoseiidae.

References

cabonus
Articles created by Qbugbot
Animals described in 1980